Mohsen Hendawy (born 20 March 1981) is an Egyptian former professional footballer who played as a right-back or right midfielder for Ghazl El Mahalla, Tala'ea El Gaish and Smouha. He made two appearances for the Egypt national team.

References

External links
 
 

1981 births
Living people
People from Desouk
Egyptian footballers
Association football fullbacks
Association football midfielders
Egypt international footballers
Egyptian Premier League players
Ghazl El Mahalla SC players
Tala'ea El Gaish SC players
Smouha SC players